Terror by Night is a 1946 Sherlock Holmes crime drama directed by Roy William Neill and starring Basil Rathbone and Nigel Bruce. The story revolves around the theft of a famous diamond aboard a train.

The film's plot is a mostly original story not directly based on any of Arthur Conan Doyle's Holmes tales, but it uses minor plot elements of "The Adventure of the Blue Carbuncle," "The Adventure of the Empty House," "The Disappearance of Lady Frances Carfax," and The Sign of Four.

The film is one of four films in the series which are in the public domain.

Plot 
In London, Vivian Vedder (Renee Godfrey) verifies that a carpenter has completed a coffin for her recently deceased mother's body, which she is transporting to Scotland by train. She boards the train that evening, as do Lady Margaret Carstairs (Mary Forbes), who owns and is transporting the famous Star of Rhodesia diamond; Lady Margaret's son, Roland (Geoffrey Steele); Sherlock Holmes, whom Roland has hired to protect the diamond; Inspector Lestrade (Dennis Hoey), who is also worried about the diamond's safety; and Dr. Watson and Watson's friend Major Duncan-Bleek (Alan Mowbray). Holmes briefly examines the diamond.

Shortly afterward, Roland is murdered and the diamond is allegedly stolen. Lestrade, Holmes, and Watson learn nothing conclusive in questioning the other passengers. At one point during the investigation, Watson believes an elderly couple is guilty of the crime but the only crime that they have committed is stealing a teapot from a hotel. While searching the train, Holmes is pushed out of the train, nearly to his death, but climbs back into the day coach and discovers a secret compartment in the coffin carrying Miss Vedder's mother. He suspects that one of the people on the train is the notorious jewel thief Colonel Sebastian Moran.

Upon further questioning, Miss Vedder admits that a man paid her to transport the coffin. As Watson and Duncan-Bleek join the group, Holmes reveals that he swapped the diamond with an imitation while examining it. Lestrade ostensibly takes possession of the real diamond.

In the luggage compartment, Holmes and Watson find a train guard murdered with a poisoned dart. Meanwhile, a street criminal named Sands (Skelton Knaggs) incapacitates the conductor. Sands was hidden inside the coffin, and is in cahoots with Duncan-Bleek, who is, in fact, Colonel Moran. Sands and Moran go to Lestrade's room, where Sands knocks Lestrade unconscious and steals the diamond from him; but Moran double-crosses Sands, shooting him dead with the same dart gun he used to kill Roland and the guard.

The train makes an unexpected stop to pick up several Scottish policemen, led allegedly by Inspector McDonald (Boyd Davis). Holmes informs McDonald that Duncan-Bleek is really Moran, and McDonald arrests Moran and finds the diamond in his vest, but Moran seizes a policeman's gun and pulls the emergency cord to stop the train. During a scuffle in which the lights are turned off, Holmes subdues and handcuffs Moran, then secretly hides him under a table. When the lights are turned on again, the officers leave the train with Lestrade, his coat covering his face, believing he is Moran. As the train departs, Lestrade captures the thieves in the railway station, and Holmes reveals to Watson and Moran that he recognized McDonald as an impostor and recovered the diamond from him during the fight.

Cast
 Basil Rathbone as Sherlock Holmes
 Nigel Bruce as Dr. Watson
 Alan Mowbray as Major Duncan-Bleek/Colonel Sebastian Moran
 Dennis Hoey as Inspector Lestrade 
 Renee Godfrey as Vivian Vedder
 Frederick Worlock as Professor Kilbane
 Mary Forbes as Lady Margaret Carstairs
 Skelton Knaggs as Sands
 Billy Bevan as Ticket Collector
 Geoffrey Steele as The Honourable Roland Carstairs
 Harry Cording as Mock the coffin maker

See also
 Sherlock Holmes
 Sherlock Holmes (1939 film series)
 List of American films of 1946

References

External links 

 
 
 
 
 
 

1946 films
1946 mystery films
American detective films
American mystery films
American black-and-white films
Films directed by Roy William Neill
Films set on trains
Sherlock Holmes films based on works by Arthur Conan Doyle
Universal Pictures films
Films set in London
Films about theft
1940s English-language films
1940s American films